The 1980 United States presidential election in Minnesota took place on November 4, 1980 as part of the 1980 United States presidential election. State voters chose ten representatives, or electors to the Electoral College, who voted for President and Vice-President.

After having leaned strongly Republican until the 1930s, Minnesota had become one of the most Democratic states in the country during the 1970s: in 1972 it was George McGovern’s second-best state in his disastrous landslide loss and more than one-seventh of the 130 counties he won nationally lay within the state. In 1974, Governor Wendell Anderson won every county in the state in a landslide gubernatorial triumph during the aftermath of Watergate.

Late in February, Carter won the state’s Democratic Party caucus over Ted Kennedy, and defeated 1976 challenger Reagan did the same for the Republicans. At the beginning of the campaign in July, Reagan aimed to focus on the problem of Carter and his lack of leadership in the industrial strongholds of the Midwest like Minnesota, although by August polls were suggesting Carter was strong in the state despite John Anderson’s third-party candidacy. However, by the middle of October Minnesota was once again rated as a “tossup”.

Minnesota was won by the Democratic Party candidate, incumbent President Jimmy Carter, won the state over former California Governor Ronald Reagan by 80,933 votes, giving him one of just seven victories in the election (other than Minnesota, Carter also carried Maryland, West Virginia, Hawaii, Rhode Island, the District of Columbia and his home state of Georgia). Despite Carter’s win in Minnesota, Reagan became the first Republican to carry Mahnomen County since Warren G. Harding in 1920.

Nationally, Reagan won the election with 489 electoral votes and 50.75% of the popular vote. Minnesota was the only state not to back Reagan in either of his presidential campaigns, casting its electoral votes in favor of Walter Mondale (a Minnesota native) in 1984.

Results

Results by county

See also
 United States presidential elections in Minnesota

References

1980
Min
1980 Minnesota elections